Eleonora Chiavarelli (1915 – 17 July 2010) was an Italian woman who was the spouse of Aldo Moro, a politician who was kidnapped and assassinated in 1978.

Biography
Chiavarelli was born in 1915 in Montemarciano. Her father was a physician. She was part of an active youth organization, Italian Catholic Federation of University Students, during her university studies. She married Aldo Moro in Montemarciano on 5 April 1945. They had four children: three daughters and a son: Maria Fida, Agnese, Anna and Giovanni. 

Her husband, Aldo Moro, was kidnapped by a terrorist group, Red Brigades, in Rome on the morning of 16 March 1978, and his corpse was found there on 9 May 1978. Following the death of Aldo Moro she did not accept the proposal of organizing a state funeral for him. The family organized a private funeral ceremony which was attended only by a small number of family members and friends on 10 May and he was buried in Torrita Tiberina, near Rome. 

After this incident Chiavarelli lived in Montemarciano and in Sanctuary of NS dei Lumi di Alberici. She died in Rome on 17 July 2010 and buried in Torrita Tiberina besides her husband's grave.

In popular culture
In an Italian crime movie, Il caso Moro, directed by Giuseppe Ferrara in 1986 Eleonora Chiavarelli was featured by Spanish actress Margarita Lozano.

References

External links

20th-century Italian women
21st-century Italian women
1915 births
2010 deaths
People from the Province of Ancona
Spouses of prime ministers of Italy
Italian Roman Catholics